The English language has a number of words that denote specific or approximate quantities that are themselves not numbers. Along with numerals, and special-purpose words like some, any, much, more, every, and all, they are Quantifiers. Quantifiers are a kind of determiner and occur in many constructions with other determiners, like articles: e.g., two dozen or more than a score. Scientific non-numerical quantities are represented as SI units.

List of non-numerical quantities

References 

English language
Numbers